"If You Were Mine" is one of the songs thrown in the year of 1991 by the British musical group Level 42 in the album Guaranteed. This song has a notable solo of the guitarist Allan Holdsworth. The music also contributes with a great performance of Gary Husband on drums.

This song is the only Level 42 song credited to just Gary Husband.

External links
Level 42 official website
Level 42/Mark King Website - Guaranteed

Level 42 songs
1991 songs
Songs written by Gary Husband